Duchesne County is a county in the northeast part of the U.S. state of Utah. As of the 2010 United States Census, the population was 18,607. Its county seat is Duchesne, and the largest city is Roosevelt.

History
Much of Duchesne County was part of the Uintah Reservation, created 1861 by US President Abraham Lincoln as a permanent home of the Uintah and White River Utes. Later the Uncompahgre Utes were moved to the Uintah and newly created Uncompahgre Indian reservations from western Colorado. At the turn of the century, under the Dawes Act, both Indian reservations were thrown open to homesteaders. This was done after allotments of land were made to Indians of the three tribes. The homesteading process was opened on the Uintah on August 27, 1905.

Unlike much of the rest of Utah Territory, settlement of the future Duchesne County area did not occur due to LDS Church pressures. It was settled by individuals who obtained 160 acres under the federal Homestead Act. Homesteaders were required to prove that they intended to farm the land. After five years of living on the land, making improvements, and paying $1.25 per acre, homesteaders were given title to their homesteads.

On July 13, 1914, a referendum was presented to voters of Wasatch County to partition the eastern part into a separate county. The referendum passed, so Utah Governor William Spry proclaimed on January 4, 1915. The county seat was decided by county vote on November 5, 1914, election. The new county was named for its county seat, which in turn was called for the Duchesne River, which flows southward and then eastward through the central part of the county near the city. Its name is of uncertain origin, but the holding theory is that fur trappers named it in the 1820s in honor of Mother Rose Philippine Duchesne, founder of the School of the Sacred Heart near St. Louis, Missouri, although other theories as to the name exist. The county boundary with Uintah County was adjusted by legislative act on March 5, 1917; Duchesne County boundaries have remained in their current configuration since that date.

Geography
Duchesne County's terrain is semi-arid, rough, and scarred with drainages. The Duchesne River drains the central part of the county. The county generally slopes to the south and east. The northern part of the county contains much of the east-west oriented Uinta Mountains. The highest natural point in Utah, Kings Peak at 13,528 feet (4,123 m), is located in Duchesne County.

Major highways

Adjacent counties

 Summit County - north
 Daggett County - northeast
 Uintah County - east
 Carbon County - south
 Utah County - southwest
 Wasatch County - west

Protected areas

 Ashley National Forest (part)
 Big Sand State Park
 Currant Creek Wildlife Management Area
 High Uintas Wilderness (part)
 Red Creek Wildlife Management Area
 Skitzy Wildlife Management Area
 Starvation State Park
 Wasatch-Cache National Forest (part)

Lakes

 Big Sand Wash Reservoir
 Cedar View Reservoir
 Chepeta Lake
 Crater Lake
 Daynes Lake
 Grandaddy Lake
 Kidney Lake
 Lake Atwood
 Mirror Lake
 Moon Lake
 Starvation Reservoir
 Upper Stillwater Reservoir

Demographics

As of the 2010 United States Census, there were 18,607 people, 6,003 households, and 4,703 families in the county. The population density was 5.74/sqmi (2.22/km2). There were 6,988 housing units at an average density of 2.16/sqmi (0.83/km2).  The racial makeup of the county was 89.15% White, 0.24% Black or African American, 4.53% Native American, 0.28% Asian, 0.27% Pacific Islander, 2.64% from other races, and 2.89% from two or more races.  6.00% of the population were Hispanic or Latino of any race.

There were 6,003 households, of which 40.23% had children under 18 living with them, 64.72% were married couples living together, 8.65% had a female householder with no husband present, and 21.66% were non-families. 45.0% of all households had individuals under 18, and 22.6% had someone living alone who was 65 years of age or older. The average household size was 3.05, and the average family size was 3.47.

The county population contained 33.91% under the age of 18, 6.56% from 20 to 24, 25.38% from 25 to 44, 20.92% from 45 to 64, and 10.66% who were 65 years of age or older. The median age was 29.7 years. For every 100 females, there were 102.80 males. For every 100 females aged 18 and over, there were 100.00 males.

The median income for a household in the county was $31,298, and the median income for a family was $35,350. Males had a median income of $31,988 versus $19,692 for females. The per capita income for the county was $12,326.  About 14.20% of families and 16.80% of the population were below the poverty line, including 19.60% of those under age 18 and 12.40% of those aged 65 or over.

2015
As of 2015 the largest self-reported ancestry groups in Duchesne County, Utah are:

Politics and Government
Clair Poulson, West Side Precinct Justice Court Judge
Travis Tucker, Sheriff
JoAnn Evans, County Clerk-Auditor

Duchesne County voters are traditionally Republican. In no national election since 1964 has the county selected the Democratic Party candidate (as of 2020).

Communities

Cities
 Duchesne (county seat)
 Myton
 Roosevelt

Towns
 Altamont
 Tabiona

Census-designated places
 Bluebell
 Neola

Unincorporated communities

 Altonah
 Arcadia
 Boneta
 Bridgeland
 Crescent
 Fruitland
 Hanna
 Hayden (part)
 Ioka
 Monarch
 Mount Emmons
 Mountain Home
 Stockmore
 Strawberry
 Talmage
 Upalco
 Utahn

Former communities
 Cedarview
 Harper

Education
All areas in the county are in the Duchesne School District.

See also
 
 List of counties in Utah
National Register of Historic Places listings in Duchesne County, Utah

References

External links

 

 
1915 establishments in Utah
Populated places established in 1915